The 2019 Nigerian Senate election in Kwara State held on February 23, 2019, to elect members of the Nigerian Senate to represent Kwara State. Ibrahim Yahaya Oloriegbe representing Kwara Central, Suleiman Sadiq Umar representing Kwara North and Yisa Oyelola Ashiru representing Kwara South all won on the platform of All Progressives Congress.

Overview

Summary

Results

Kwara Central 
A total of 22 candidates registered with the Independent National Electoral Commission to contest in the election. APC candidate Ibrahim Oloriegbe won the election, defeating PDP candidate Bukola Saraki and 20 other party candidates. Oloriegbe received 63.15% of the votes, while Saraki received 35.19%

Kwara North 
A total of 15 candidates registered with the Independent National Electoral Commission to contest in the election. APC candidate Suleiman Sadiq Umar won the election, defeating PDP candidate Mohammed Zakari and 13 other party candidates. Suleiman Umar received 73.86% of the votes, while Zakari received 25.10%

Kwara South 
A total of 20 candidates registered with the Independent National Electoral Commission to contest in the election. APC candidate Yisa Oyelola Ashiru won the election, defeating PDP candidate Rafiu Adebayo Ibrahim and 18 other party candidates. Lola Ashiru received 65.53% of the votes, while Rafiu  received 33.00%

References 

Kwara State senatorial elections